Ada Svetlova – Latvian singer,  mezzo-soprano, and performer of classical and ethnic repertoire.

Biography
Born in 1939 in Kharkiv, Ukraine (former USSR). She graduated from the Conservatory of Chişinău, Moldova (former Moldavian SSR, USSR). She served as a soloist of the Latvian State Philharmonic in Riga (former Latvian SSR, USSR). Svetlova was known as a chamber singer of classical repertoire. In the 70-80s years of last century she got the fame of a fine interpreter of Yiddish folksongs arranged in a contemporary classical idiom by Max Goldin. Later on, A.Svetlova was joined by the Riga instrumental ensemble "Via tertia" under the direction of Samuel Heifetz, who created a crossroad mode arrangements for her songs, attainable by a wider audience. She works as a vocal coach residing in Tel-Aviv, Israel.

Recordings
Jewish Folksongs, arranged by Max Goldin, Ada Svetlova (vocals), Natalia Schroeder (piano). LP. Allunion Recording Label Melodiya, USSR, 1981,C30-13293-4

Sources
Tobias Shklover. "The chant of her soul" (in Yiddish), Sovetysh Heymland magazine, issue 11, 1988, Moscow, USSR
T.Shklover. "Date with Jewish music" (in Yiddish). Folks-Sztyme weekly, No.23 (4885) of 6 March 1988, Warsaw, Poland

1939 births
20th-century Latvian women opera singers
Latvian Jews
Yiddish-language folklore
Yiddish-language singers
Living people